Forks of Waters (formerly Strait Creek) is an unincorporated community located in Highland County, Virginia, United States. Forks of Waters is so named due to the convergence of the Strait Creek with the South Branch Potomac River near the community.

References

Unincorporated communities in Highland County, Virginia
Unincorporated communities in Virginia